Notes From the Midnight Driver is a young adult novel by Jordan Sonnenblick. It was published by Scholastic in 2006.

Plot summary
Alex Gregory is a  16-year-old boy, One night, while his mom was on a date because his dad ran off with his third-grade teacher, he was drinking and was intoxicated. A bit later, while still intoxicated, he took his mom's car to pay his father a visit, Then he ends up hitting a  lawn gnome and then later vomited on a police officer. To pay back the $500 from breaking the lawn gnome,  Alex has to do 100 hours of community service at a nursing home. He is assigned to a man named Solomon, Alex is frustrated by Solomon, but the judge will not change his assignment.

Alex's best friend, Laurie, is a beautiful martial arts master. After meeting her, Solomon constantly teases Alex by calling Laurie his wife throughout the book. Solomon's comments about Laurie make Alex realize his feelings for her.

One day, Alex practices his guitar while waiting for Solomon and learns that the man used to be a Jazz guitar player. They start to bond and Solomon begins to teach Alex and taught some valuable lessons in music and in life. Alex begins playing benefit concerts with Steven and Annette (from Sonnenblick's first book Drums, Girls, and Dangerous Pie) to give the residents something to look forward to in their boring lives. At one such concert Solomon plays a rendition of Sunrise, Sunset causing the judge to have a very emotional reaction leading to the revelation that she is Solomon's daughter, Judy, from whom he has been estranged for many years. Solomon then dies the next day, and they have his funeral soon after.

References

External links
Review on teenreads.com

2006 American novels
American young adult novels
Scholastic Corporation books